The chapters of The Young Magician are written and illustrated by Yuri Narushima. The chapters have been serialized in the Japanese manga magazine Wings by Shinshokan since November 1995. Shinshokan collects the chapters into tankōbon volumes; eighteen volumes have been published so far.

In 2005, the manga imprint of DC Comics, CMX, announced that it had licensed The Young Magician for an English-language release in North America. CMX put together an eighty-page sampler of manga for mature readers—The Young Magician, Sword of the Dark Ones, Monster Collection: The Girl Who Can Deal With Magic Monsters, Testarotho and Madara—and distributed it to retailers on June 8, 2005. CMX published thirteen volumes of The Young Magician from September 1, 2005, to April 21, 2009. Scheduled for publication on May 11, 2010, the fourteen volume remained unreleased as DC Comics announced on May 18 that the CMX imprint would end on July 1.

Volume list

References

Young Magician, The